Autologous chondrocyte implantation (ACI, ATC code ) is a biomedical treatment that repairs damages in articular cartilage. ACI provides pain relief while at the same time slowing down the progression or considerably delaying partial or total joint replacement (knee replacement) surgery. The goal of ACI is to allow people suffering from articular cartilage damage to return to their old lifestyle; regaining mobility, going back to work and even practicing sports again.

ACI procedures aim to provide complete hyaline repair tissues for articular cartilage repair. Over the last 20 years, the procedure has become more widespread and it is currently probably the most developed articular cartilage repair technique.

The procedure fails in about 15% of people.



Procedure
This cell based articular cartilage repair procedure takes place in three stages. In a first stage, between 200 and 300 milligrams cartilage is sampled arthroscopically from a less weight bearing area from either the intercondylar notch or the superior ridge of the medial or lateral femoral condyle of the patient. The matrix is removed enzymatically and the chondrocytes isolated. These cells are grown in vitro in a specialised laboratory for approximately four to six weeks, until there are enough cells to reimplant on the damaged area of the articular cartilage. The patient then undergoes a second treatment, in which the chondrocytes are applied on the damaged area during an open-knee surgery (also called arthrotomy). These autologous cells should adapt themselves to their new environment by forming new cartilage. During the implantation, chondrocytes are applied on the damaged area in combination with a membrane (tibial periosteum or biomembrane) or pre-seeded in a scaffold matrix.

Complications 
The occurrence of subsequent surgical procedures (SSPs), primarily arthroscopy, following ACI is common. For example, in the Study of the Treatment of Articular Repair (STAR), 49% of Carticel ACI patients underwent an SSP on the treated knee, during the 4-year follow up. The most common serious adverse events (up to 5% of patients), include arthrofibrosis and joint adhesions, graft overgrowth, chondromalacia or chondrosis, cartilage injury, graft complication, meniscal lesion, graft delamination, and osteoarthritis.

A recent study from Germany, published in the November 2008 issue of the American Journal of Sports Medicine, analyzed 349 ACI procedures of the knee joint. Three different ACI techniques were used. A major proportion of complications after ACI can be summarized by 4 major diagnoses: symptomatic hypertrophy, disturbed fusion, delamination, and graft failure. Among those, the overall complication rate and incidence of hypertrophy of the transplant were higher for periosteum-covered ACI. Furthermore, an increased rate of symptomatic hypertrophy was found for patellar defects.

Improvement of ACI 

Techniques such as the EELS-TALC to enhance ACI and its next generation advancement called Matrix Assisted Chondrocyte Implantation (MACI) with enabling chondrocytes to be tissue engineered with long term native knee cartilage phenotype maintenance in vitro and in vivo, with the engineered tissue construct containing stem cell progenitors along with those expressing pluripotency markers and with added advantage of enriched hyaluronic acid (HA) expression by the cells have been reported which will contribute to improved regenerative therapies for cartilage damage.

References 

Orthopedic surgical procedures